Cuba is an unincorporated community in Putnam County, in the U.S. state of Ohio.

History
Cuba was a station on the railroad. The post office Cuba once had was called Sheridan. This post office was in operation from 1866 until 1892.

References

Unincorporated communities in Putnam County, Ohio
Unincorporated communities in Ohio